Mochlus pembanus, also known as the Pemba Island writhing skink, is a species of skink. It is found on Pemba Island off the coast of Tanzania and in coastal Kenya; the latter could be introductions.

Mochlus pembanus is fossorial and nocturnal. It occurs in coastal woodland and in a range of agricultural habitats. It is very common on Pemba and regularly encountered in Kenya.

References

Mochlus
Skinks of Africa
Reptiles of Kenya
Reptiles of Tanzania
Reptiles described in 1913
Taxa named by Oskar Boettger